Arc of Yesod is a video game by Odin Computer Graphics. It was published in 1985 for the ZX Spectrum and Commodore 64. It is the sequel to Nodes of Yesod.

Plot
The Monolith, (a homage to the film 2001: A Space Odyssey) which was the object of the previous game, Nodes of Yesod teleported off into space just as Charlemagne 'Charlie' Fotheringham-Grunes was completing his quest. He has followed it to its home planet of Ariat and must now finally destroy it, before the Ariatians download the data it has collected and employ it to destroy the Earth.

Gameplay
The game is very similar to Nodes of Yesod. Charlie must penetrate the alien city where the Monolith is being held, via a network of caves and tunnels, and make his way to the Security Centre, where the Monolith can be disarmed and destroyed.

Reception
Crash magazine reviewed the game saying although it was very similar to previous title Nodes of Yesod "I strongly recommend Arc as you’d find it very playable and addictive", and giving it a rating of 89%.

References

External links

Arc of Yesod at Lemon 64
Arc of Yesod at C64.com

1985 video games
Commodore 64 games
Platform games
Science fiction video games
Video games developed in the United Kingdom
Video games scored by Fred Gray
ZX Spectrum games